Edílson Rodrigues Vieira (born 31 July 1941), known as just Edílson, is a Brazilian former footballer.

References

1941 births
Living people
Association football defenders
Brazilian footballers
Associação Portuguesa de Desportos players
Pan American Games medalists in football
Pan American Games silver medalists for Brazil
Footballers at the 1959 Pan American Games
Medalists at the 1959 Pan American Games